2'-5'-oligoadenylate synthetase 1 is an enzyme that in humans is encoded by the OAS1 gene.

This gene encodes a member of the 2-5A synthetase family, which include essential proteins involved in the innate immune response to viral infection. 

The encoded protein is induced by interferons and uses adenosine triphosphate in 2'-specific nucleotidyl transfer reactions to synthesize 2',5'-oligoadenylates (2-5As). These molecules activate latent RNase L, which results in both viral and endogenous RNA degradation and the inhibition of viral replication. The three known members of this gene family are located in a cluster on chromosome 12. Hypomorphic mutations in this gene have been associated with host susceptibility to viral infection, while gain-of-function variants can cause autoinflammatory immunodeficiency. Alternatively spliced transcript variants encoding different isoforms have been described.

References

Further reading